Ruby Leilani N. Ashbourne Serkis (born 10 March 1998) is an English actress.

Early life
Ashbourne Serkis was born in Hackney, East London, to actors Andy Serkis and Lorraine Ashbourne and grew up in North London with her younger brothers Sonny and Louis. She attended the City of London School for Girls.

Career
Ashbourne Serkis began her career with small cameos before landing a titular role in the 2015 BBC One television film adaptation of Laurie Lee's memoir Cider with Rosie, for which she received critical acclaim. The following year, she portrayed a young version of Susan Lynch's character in the Channel 4 miniseries National Treasure.

Ashbourne Serkis returned to television in 2020 as Lavinia in the Netflix fantasy series The Letter for the King, an English-language adaptation of the classic Dutch book by Tonke Dragt. She appeared opposite Alice Englert in the first episode of the crime drama The Serpent. She and her brother Sonny portrayed siblings in the film La Cha Cha. Although the film received mixed reviews, Ashbourne Serkis' performance was praised. In November 2021, Ashbourne Serkis joined the cast of the upcoming Apple TV+ film The Greatest Beer Run Ever.

Filmography

Film

Television

Audio

References

External links
 

1998 births
Living people
21st-century English actresses
Actresses from London
English child actresses
English film actresses
English television actresses
English voice actresses
English video game actresses
English people of Armenian descent
English people of Iraqi descent
People educated at the City of London School for Girls
People from the London Borough of Hackney